Kim Kyu-min (Hangul: 김규민; born 28 December 1990) is a volleyball player from South Korea. He currently plays as a middle blocker for the Incheon Korean Air Jumbos club in V-League.

Career
As a senior at Kyonggi University in 2013, Kim completed in the Summer Universiade and East Asian Games as a member of the collegiate national team.

Kim was drafted in the 1st round of the 2013 V-League Draft, 5th overall, by Ansan OK Savings Bank. In the 2013–14 season, Kim averaged 0.44 blocks per set, ranked 10th in the league. The following season, Kim averaged 0.55 blocks per set (10th in the league) and led his team to its first V-League championship win.

In the 2016–17 season, Kim was traded to the Daejeon Samsung Fire Bluefangs.

References

External links
 Kim Kyu-min profile at 2013 Summer Universiade
 profile at FIVB.org

1990 births
Living people
South Korean men's volleyball players
Kyonggi University alumni
Place of birth missing (living people)
Asian Games silver medalists for South Korea
Asian Games medalists in volleyball
Medalists at the 2018 Asian Games
Volleyball players at the 2018 Asian Games
Sportspeople from South Jeolla Province
21st-century South Korean people